The Montenegrin Air Force (V i PVO) is the air arm of the Military of Montenegro. The aircraft marking of the Montenegrin Air Force consist of a red-on-gold roundel, currently being the sole air arm using the latter colour in its official insignia.

History 
In 1991–1992, Yugoslavia disintegrated, and the republics of Serbia and Montenegro established the Federal Republic of Yugoslavia. The Air Force was renamed the Air Force of Serbia and Montenegro, (also known as the Air Force of Yugoslavia). In spring of 1999 they suffered heavy losses in NATO bombing of Yugoslavia, during the Kosovo War. After years of political turmoil, Montenegro declared its independence in June 2006, bringing an end to the state union of Serbia and Montenegro.

Aircraft inventory 
 
Following the dissolution of the state union of Serbia and Montenegro, the newly formed Republic of Montenegro was left with a considerable number of aircraft at the Golubovci airbase, more than required for its own needs. After the break-up, speculation arose regarding the division of the aircraft, but the Serbian Ministry of Defense issued a statement declaring that the eventual division of the fleet was not in either country's interest. However, a total of 11 G-4 Super Galebs, of which 8 are airworthy, were still located at the base in 2008. An official decision regarding their fate has not been made, but most likely they will not be operated by Montenegro due to expensive operating costs. The four Utva 75 trainer aircraft have a better chance to become operational, although no decision about them has been made yet.

Current inventory

Retired

Aircraft markings

References

Military of Montenegro
Military units and formations established in 2006
Air forces by country
2006 establishments in Montenegro